Voyageurs is the title of the 2003 novel by Scottish writer Margaret Elphinstone. It sets a young Quaker farmer from rural England in search of his missing missionary sister; he must work as a voyageur to have any hope of finding her.

References 
 Charles, Ron. A brother's sacred, deadly duty (Review of Voyageurs at The Christian Science Monitor)
 Soderstrom, Mary.  Review of Voyageurs at Quill and Quire])

2003 British novels
Scottish novels
Novels set in Northern Ontario
Canongate Books books